Yasmin Giger (born 6 November 1999) is a Swiss athlete specialising in the 400 metres hurdles. She represented her country at the 2017 World Championships without advancing from the first round. In addition, she won a gold medal at the 2017 European U20 Championships.

Her personal best in the event is 55.90 seconds set in Grosseto in 2017. Earlier in her career she competed in the heptathlon.

Personal life
Giger is of Dominican descent through her mother.

International competitions

References

1999 births
Living people
Swiss female hurdlers
World Athletics Championships athletes for Switzerland
Swiss people of Dominican Republic descent
Sportspeople of Dominican Republic descent
Athletes (track and field) at the 2020 Summer Olympics
Olympic athletes of Switzerland